D-trix Presents Dance Showdown (formerly known as Dance Showdown Presented by D-trix) was a dance competition web-series created by DanceOn, a YouTube-funded channel created by Amanda Taylor. DanceOn broadcasts the series on YouTube. The series premiered on April 5, 2012.

Judges

Season 2
Laurieann Gibson, a VMA-winning choreographer,
Joey Fatone, former member of 'N Sync, and runner-up on the fourth season of the American version of Dancing with the Stars
with
Dave Days (First Show), a YouTube celebrity and musician
Ryan Higa (Second Show), a YouTube celebrity known for the former most subscribed YouTube channel, nigahiga
Shane Dawson (Third Show), a YouTube celebrity known for his channel, ShaneDawsonTV

Season 3
Joey Fatone, former member of 'N Sync, and runner-up on the fourth season of the American version of Dancing with the Stars.
Laurieann Gibson, a VMA-winning choreographer.
Kassem Gharaibeh, a YouTube celebrity, better known by his stage name, KassemG

Season 4
Laurieann Gibson, a VMA-winning choreographer.
Steve Kardynal, a YouTube celebrity and comedian and finalist of the third season of DanceShowdown,
Dominic Sandoval, host of DanceShowdown, Dancer, YouTube Star named D-Trix, season 3 contestant and later all star of So You Think You Can Dance, and winner of seasons 3 and 8 of America's Best Dance Crew along with Quest Crew

Season 1
The first season premiered on April 5, 2012 and for ten episodes until May 31, 2012. For the first season the series was named Dance Showdown Presented by D-trix. Dominic Sandoval, better known as D-trix was the host of the first season. The winner, WoodysGamertag was awarded $25,000.

Contestants:
 xJawz (Sam Betesh)
 Tay Zonday
 Good Neighbor
 Itskingsleybitch
 Hannah Hart
 Obama Girl (Amber Lee Ettinger)
 Hot For Words (Marina Orlova)
 JLovesMac1
 SeaNanners (Adam Montoya)
 Lana McKissack
 WhatsUpElle (Elle Walker)
 WoodysGamertag (Matthew Woodworth)

Professional Dancers:
Lauren Froderman
Bryan Tanaka
Ian Eastwood
Kherington Payne

Season 2
The second season premiered on October 5, 2012. The judges featured for the second season included Joey Fatone, Ryan Higa, Shane Dawson, Dave Days, Laurieann Gibson. Dominic Sandoval returned as the host of the series for the second season.  The winner, Jesse Wellens from PrankvsPrank, was awarded $100,000 after winning the Viewer's Vote and the Judge's Pick.

Contestants:
 Alphacat (Iman Crosson)
 Andrew Garcia
 Brittani Louise Taylor
 Chester See
 ChimneySwift11 
 ExoticJess
 Meghan Rosette
 MissHannahMinx (Hannah Wagner)
 ONLYUSEmeBLADE
 PrankvsPrank (Jesse Wellens)
 StilaBabe09 (Meredith Foster) 
 Screen Team Show

Professional Dancers:
Lauren Froderman
Mike Song
Brinn Nicole
Anze Skrube

Season 3
On October 21, 2013, a teaser for the third season was released. Fatone and Gibson returned as judges, but KassemG was presented as a new third judge. DanceOn partnered with Coca-Cola and the (RED) Campaign, to create a special episode of Dance Showdown. The winner, Egoraptor, was awarded $50,000 after winning the Viewer's Vote and the Judge's Pick.

Contestants:
Lindsey Stirling
MysteryGuitarMan (Joe Penna)
Sam Pepper and Lancifer
Steve Kardynal
Strawburry17 (Meghan Camarena) 
Egoraptor (Arin Hanson)
GlamLifeGuru (Tati Westbrook)
Macbby11 (Alisha Marie)

Professional Dancers:
Anze Skrube
Emily Sasson
Anisha Gibs
Brinn Nicole
Anthony Lee
Maxine Hupy
Matt Steffanina
David Moore

Season 4
On September 17, 2015, a teaser trailer for Season 4 was released. Season 4 was won by Vine sensation, Gabbie Hanna and her partner Matt Steffanina. The final episode of Dance Showdown was published on December 22, 2015.

Contestants:
AJ Rafael
Jorge Narvaez
Arika Sato
Jackie Hernandez
Gabbie Hanna
Brian Brushwood

Professional Dancers:
 Bryan Tanaka 
 Ian Eastwood 
 Kherington Payne
 Lauren Froderman, winner of the seventh season of So You Think You Can Dance. Froderman is also the only returning professional dancer from the previous season.
 Brinn Nicole, a dancer on Snoop Dogg's world tour.
 Anže Škrube, the choreographer of the music video for No One and a nine-time gold medalist at the Slovenian National Championship
 Mike Song, finalist on America's Best Dance Crew
 Maxine Hupy
 Matt Steffanina

References

2010s YouTube series
2012 web series debuts
2015 web series endings